The 1953 All-Pro Team consisted of American football players chosen by various selectors for the All-Pro team of the National Football League (NFL) for the 1953 NFL season. Teams were selected by, among others, the Associated Press (AP) (based on voting among 48 member paper sports writers and AP staffers), the United Press (UP), and the New York Daily News.

Selections

References

All-Pro Teams
1953 National Football League season